Eduardo Manglés (born 7 November 1975) is a Venezuelan judoka. He competed in the men's lightweight event at the 2000 Summer Olympics.

References

1975 births
Living people
Venezuelan male judoka
Olympic judoka of Venezuela
Judoka at the 2000 Summer Olympics
Place of birth missing (living people)